Acompsia maculosella is a moth of the family Gelechiidae. It is found in the central and eastern parts of the Alps, where it is known from Austria, Slovenia, Switzerland, Italy and Germany. It is found in montane habitats, including subalpine and alpine meadows and shrubs.

The wingspan is 16–21 mm for males and about 16 mm for females. The forewings are clay brown, mottled with lighter brown scales. The hindwings are grey. Adults are on wing from July to August.

References

Moths described in 1851
Acompsia
Moths of Europe